

Current members (2023)

Keys:

Alphabetical List of all Members from Odisha since 1952

References

External links
Rajya Sabha homepage hosted by the Indian government
Rajya Sabha FAQ page hosted by the Indian government
Nominated members list
State wise list

Odisha
 
Odisha-related lists